William Robert Wallace (February 21, 1886 – June 24, 1960) was a United States district judge of the United States District Court for the Eastern District of Oklahoma, the United States District Court for the Northern District of Oklahoma and the United States District Court for the Western District of Oklahoma.

Education and career

Born in Troy, Texas, Wallace attended the University of Oklahoma College of Law and read law to enter the bar in 1910. He was in private practice in Pauls Valley, Oklahoma from 1910 to 1925, and then in Oklahoma City, Oklahoma until 1950. During this time, he was a member of the Oklahoma House of Representatives from 1909 to 1910, city attorney of Pauls Valley from 1911 to 1912, a county judge of Garvin County, Oklahoma from 1913 to 1917, and a member of the Oklahoma Senate from 1919 to 1923. He was Chairman of the Oklahoma Public Welfare Commission from 1939 to 1942.

Federal judicial service

Wallace was nominated by President Harry S. Truman on April 17, 1950, to a joint seat on the United States District Court for the Eastern District of Oklahoma, United States District Court for the Northern District of Oklahoma and the United States District Court for the Western District of Oklahoma vacated by Judge Bower Slack Broaddus. He was confirmed by the United States Senate on June 2, 1950, and received his commission on June 8, 1950. His service terminated on June 24, 1960, due to his death.

References

Sources
 

1886 births
1960 deaths
University of Oklahoma alumni
Oklahoma state court judges
Democratic Party members of the Oklahoma House of Representatives
Democratic Party Oklahoma state senators
Judges of the United States District Court for the Western District of Oklahoma
Judges of the United States District Court for the Northern District of Oklahoma
Judges of the United States District Court for the Eastern District of Oklahoma
United States district court judges appointed by Harry S. Truman
20th-century American judges
United States federal judges admitted to the practice of law by reading law
People from Bell County, Texas